The Château d'Eau is a nineteenth century water tower, near to the cours Dillon, just next to the Pont-Neuf, in Toulouse, France. It was originally designed as a water tower but it is now a photography gallery. Founded in 1974 by Jean Dieuzaide and directed by  since 2001, it's one of the oldest public places dedicated to photography in the world,

See also

External links
 Official website 
 Mairie de Toulouse : Le Château d'Eau

Towers completed in 1825
Water towers in France
Museums in Toulouse
Photography museums and galleries in France